The 1979 Men's European Volleyball Championship was the eleventh edition of the event, organized by Europe's governing volleyball body, the Confédération Européenne de Volleyball. It was hosted in several cities in France from October 5 to October 12, 1979, with the final round held in Paris.

Teams

Group A – Nantes

Group B – Saint-Quentin

Group C – Toulouse

Preliminary round

Final round

Final ranking

References
 Results

Men's European Volleyball Championships
E
Volleyball Championship
V
Volleyball in Paris